This is a list of Latvian football transfers in the 2012–13 winter transfer window by club. Only transfers of the Virsliga are included.

All transfers mentioned are shown in the references at the bottom of the page. If you wish to insert a transfer that isn't mentioned there, please add a reference.

Latvian Higher League

Daugava Daugavpils 

In:

Out:

Skonto 

In:

Out:

Ventspils 

In:

Out:

Liepājas Metalurgs 

In:

Out:

Spartaks 

In:

Out:

Jūrmala 

In:

Out:

Jelgava 

In:

Out:

METTA/LU 

In:

Out:

Daugava Rīga 

In:

Out:

Ilūkste 

In:

Out:

References

External links 
 sportacentrs.com 

2012-13
Latvia
Football
transfers
transfers